John Day Andrews (August 30, 1795 – August 30, 1882) was a tavern keeper, carpenter, merchant, planter, and politician. He worked in Virginia as a plantation overseer and owned a tavern. He relocated to Houston around 1838, where he worked as a carpenter, a dry goods merchant, and a planter. He served as an Alderman and a mayor of Houston.

Early life and business career
John Day Andrews was the son of John and Elizabeth Lipscomb Andrews, and was born in Spotsylvania County, Virginia on August 30, 1795.

Andrews arrived in Houston with his family as early as 1837.

Political life
Andrews started public life in Houston in 1838, when he co-founded Christ Church in Houston. He served as the founding president of the Houston Board of Health. He served two one-year terms as mayor of Houston in 1841 and 1842, establishing the first city hall in is second year.

As Mayor of Houston, Andrews worked with the City Council to establish a wharf tax to create revenue for improvements to the port. These funds were used to dredge Buffalo Bayou and improve the steamboat landing. Another act of Andrews and City Council established the Port of Houston Authority, with a mandate to regulate all landings in Houston along Buffalo Bayou and White Oak Bayou. Andrews also led an effort to clear ship wrecks and other debris from the channel.

Personal life
Andrews sired Sarah Goodwin, who was born in 1814, but he did not admit this to his family. He married Eugenia Price Thilman on November 25, 1830. Thilman was a widow and Andrews adopted both of her daughters. They also had at least two daughters from their own marriage.

Death
Andrews died in Houston on his birthday, August 30, 1882. He is buried at Glenwood Cemetery.

Citations

References
 

1795 births
1882 deaths
Mayors of Houston
People from Spotsylvania County, Virginia
People from Houston
Republic of Texas politicians